The 2020 Badminton Asia Team Championships (also known as the 2020 Smart Badminton Asia Manila Team Championship due to sponsorship reasons) was staged at the Rizal Memorial Coliseum in Manila, Philippines, from 11 to 16 February 2020. This championships was organized by the Badminton Asia with Philippine Badminton Association as host organiser and sanctioned by the Badminton World Federation. This tournament served as the Asian qualifiers for the 2020 Thomas & Uber Cup in Denmark. Competitors could also accumulate points as part of qualification process for 2020 Summer Olympics badminton tournament in Tokyo. Indonesia and Japan were the defending champions on men's and women's category respectively. They both successfully defended their title.

Medalists

Squads

Tournament
The 2020 Badminton Asia Team Championships officially crowned the best male and female national badminton teams in Asia and at the same time served as the Asian qualification event towards the 2020 Thomas & Uber Cup finals. Twenty-four teams, consisting of 12 men's teams and 12 women's teams entered the tournament. China and Hong Kong withdrew from the tournament due to the Philippine government's ban on foreigners regardless of nationality from visiting the host country from China due to concerns over the COVID-19 pandemic.

Venue
This tournament was held at Rizal Memorial Coliseum in Manila, Philippines.

Seeds
The seeding was based on team ranking on 21 January 2020.
 Men's team

 
 
 
 
 
 
 
 

 Women's team

Draw
The draw was held on 29 January 2020, at the Century Park Hotel in Manila. Both men's and women's team group stage consist of four groups with three teams.

However, due to the withdrawal of China and Hong Kong, the men's tournament groups were re-drawn on 10 February 2020. No redrawing was made for the women's tournament despite the withdrawal of India.
 Men's team

 Women's team

Men's team

Group stage

Group A

Group B

Group C

Group D

Knockout stage

Quarter-finals

Semi-finals

Final

Women's team

Group stage

Group W

Group X

Group Y

Group Z

Knockout stage

Quarter-finals

Semi-finals

Final

References

 
Asia Champ
Badminton tournaments in the Philippines
2020 in Philippine sport
International sports competitions hosted by the Philippines
Badminton Asia Team Championships
Badminton Asia Team Championships